The New Croton Dam (also known as Cornell Dam) is a dam forming the New Croton Reservoir, both parts of the New York City water supply system.

Construction began in 1892 and was completed in 1906. At the time of its completion, it was the tallest dam in the world.

History

Background
The original Croton Dam (Old Croton Dam) was built between 1837 and 1842 to improve New York City's water supply. To meet escalating water needs, the Aqueduct Commission of the City of New York ordered construction of a new Croton system in 1885. Hydro engineer James B. Francis was brought in as a consultant for the construction.

The proposed dam and reservoir were to cover  of land occupied by public and private buildings, six cemeteries, and more than 400 farms. Condemnation disputes led to "protests, lawsuits, and confusion" before payment of claims and the awarding of construction contracts. The work force on the new dam included stonemasons and laborers who had worked on the original dam. John B. Goldsborough, superintendent of excavations and hiring for the project, also recruited stonemasons from southern Italy, who re-located to New York.

Construction
Construction began in 1892 and was completed in 1906.

Building the dam meant diverting the river from its normal path and pumping the riverbed dry. The initial construction lasted eight years, and extensive modifications and repairs went on for another six. Working conditions were often difficult. A silent film, The Croton Dam Strike, released in 1900, depicted labor–management problems related to the dam's construction.

At the time of its completion, it was the tallest dam in the world.

New Croton Reservoir was eventually able to supply  a day via a new aqueduct that carried water to Jerome Park Reservoir in the north Bronx, New York City.

Repair

The bridge over the spillway was replaced in 1975 and again in 2005. In that same year, because of the September 11 attacks on New York City, the New York City Department of Environmental Protection proposed permanent closure of the road across the top of the dam. Pedestrians and emergency vehicles were allowed to use New Croton Dam Road, but all other traffic was re-routed. The department made plans to replace temporary vehicle barriers with permanent barriers after completion of a New Croton Dam Rehabilitation Project in 2011.

Discharge Data
U.S. Geological survey provides average daily discharge data for the Croton Dam here.  Record discharge at the Croton Dam since records began in 1933 was on 1955-10-16 with 33,000 cfs (cubic feet per second); this was after dual hurricanes Connie and Diane.

Trails
Croton Gorge Park offers views of the dam from directly downstream. The Old Croton Trail, a popular hiking and biking path that roughly follows the route of the Old Croton Aqueduct, has an endpoint near the base of the dam. Teatown Lake Reservation, a nature preserve, lies nearby as does Croton Point Park in Croton-on-Hudson.

References

External links

Dams in New York (state)
Croton Watershed
Buildings and structures in Westchester County, New York
Dams completed in 1906
Historic American Engineering Record in New York (state)
Masonry dams
1906 establishments in New York (state)